Western Phnom Penh, previously known as Western Uni.  before January 2015 and Sparta Phnom Penh, and Western Phnom Penh FC during 2015, is a football (soccer) club in Cambodia. It plays in the Cambodian League, the top division of Cambodian football.

Current squad

References

External links 
 

Football clubs in Cambodia
Sport in Phnom Penh